The Pakistan women's national tennis team represents Pakistan in international tennis competitions. It is administered by the Pakistan Tennis Federation (PTF). Members of the team compete in singles, doubles, mixed doubles and team events at competitions including continental and regional games (Asian and South Asian Games). It also has a team which competes at the Fed Cup.

Members
The following is a list of women who have competed internationally for Pakistan (including in the Fed Cup)

Results

Billie Jean King Cup (formerly Fed Cup)

South Asian Games

Medals

References

Women's team
Tennis
Women's sport in Pakistan